Pourya amini Amini (born February 27, 1995) is an Iranian footballer.

Club career

Club Career Statistics
Last Update: 1 August 2018

References

External links

Living people
1995 births
Association football midfielders
Iranian footballers
Esteghlal F.C. players
Pars Jonoubi Jam players
Naft Tehran F.C. players
Shahrdari Bandar Abbas players